The 2016 Celebration Bowl (officially known as the 2016 Air Force Reserve Celebration Bowl) was a post-season American college football bowl game played on December 17, 2016, at the Georgia Dome in Atlanta, Georgia. The second Celebration Bowl game  matched the champion of the Mid-Eastern Athletic Conference, against the champion of the Southwestern Athletic Conference, the two historically black division I conferences.  This was the last edition of the Celebration Bowl (and the penultimate college football game) played at the Georgia Dome, as the Dome was demolished in November 2017 following the opening of its successor, Mercedes-Benz Stadium, three months prior. The third and future editions of the Celebration Bowl were moved to the new stadium.

Teams
The participants for the Celebration Bowl game are based upon the final regular season standings which determine the MEAC football champion and the SWAC football championship Game determining the SWAC representative.

North Carolina Central

North Carolina Central entered the season ranked 4th in both the Sheridan & BoxtoRow polls and picked to finish 3rd overall in the MEAC. The Eagles started their season with back to back losses to FBS opponents Duke and Western Michigan. The Eagles rebounded to win 9 straight, defeating state rival North Carolina A&T in the final MEAC regular season game. The Eagles entered the Celebration Bowl ranked #18 in the FCS.

Grambling

Grambling started the season ranked 5th in national black college football polls and picked 2nd in the SWAC Western division. The Tigers began the season defeating Virginia-Lynchburg and going up 21–0 before watching FBS opponent Arizona rally to defeat them. Grambling rolled after that with 10 straight wins. The Tigers enter the Celebration Bowl ranked #14.

Game summary

Scoring summary

Statistics

References

Celebration Bowl
Celebration Bowl
Grambling State Tigers football bowl games
North Carolina Central Eagles football bowl games
Celebration Bowl
Celebration Bowl